Mongolia participated at the 2018 Summer Youth Olympics in Buenos Aires, Argentina from 6 October to 18 October 2018.

Medalists

Medals awarded to participants of mixed-NOC (combined) teams are represented in italics. These medals are not counted towards the individual NOC medal tally.

Basketball

Mongolia qualified a boys' team based on the U18 3x3 National Federation Ranking.

 Boys' tournament – 1 team of 4 athletes

Judo

Individual

Team

Shooting

Individual

Team

Taekwondo

Weightlifting

Mongolia qualified one athlete based on its performance at the 2018 Asian Youth Championships.

Wrestling

Key:
  – Victory by Fall
  – Without any points scored by the opponent
  – With point(s) scored by the opponent
  – Without any points scored by the opponent
  – With point(s) scored by the opponent

References

2018 in Mongolian sport
Nations at the 2018 Summer Youth Olympics
Mongolia at the Youth Olympics